Heritage High School is the name of several high schools:

Canada
Heritage Regional High School, St-Hubert, Quebec

United Kingdom
Heritage High School, Clowne, Derbyshire, England

United States
Heritage High School (Brentwood, California)
Heritage High School (Romoland, California)
Heritage High School (Littleton, Colorado)
Heritage High School (Palm Bay, Florida)
Heritage High School (Conyers, Georgia)
Heritage High School (Ringgold, Georgia)
Heritage High School (Monroeville, Indiana)
Heritage High School (Baltimore, Maryland)
Heritage High School (Saginaw, Michigan), Saginaw Charter Township, Michigan
Heritage High School (Maryville, Tennessee)
Heritage High School (Frisco, Texas)
Heritage High School (Leesburg, Virginia)
Heritage High School (Lynchburg, Virginia)
Heritage High School (Newport News, Virginia)
Heritage High School (Vancouver, Washington)
Heritage High School (Wake Forest, North Carolina)
Rogers Heritage High School, Rogers, Arkansas
Colleyville Heritage High School, Colleyville, Texas

See also
 Heritage (disambiguation)
 Heritage School (disambiguation)
 American Heritage School (disambiguation)
 Christian Heritage School (disambiguation)
 Heritage Academy (disambiguation)
 Heritage College (disambiguation)